Riptide is the eighth studio album by English singer Robert Palmer, released in November 1985 by Island Records. The album was recorded over a period of three months in 1985 at Compass Point Studios in Nassau, Bahamas. The album peaked at No. 5 on the UK Albums Chart and at No. 8 on the US Billboard 200. It was certified double Platinum in the US by the RIAA in March 1996 and certified Gold in the UK by BPI in August 1986. It features the songs "Addicted to Love", "I Didn't Mean to Turn You On", "Hyperactive", "Discipline of Love", and "Riptide" which were all released as singles. The single "Addicted to Love" was accompanied by an iconic and much-imitated music video, directed by Terence Donovan, in which Palmer is surrounded by a bevy of near-identically clad, heavily made-up (and appropriately pouty) female "musicians" (the killer bimbo clones), either mimicking or mocking the painting style of Patrick Nagel. In September 1986, Palmer performed "Addicted to Love" at the 1986 MTV Video Music Awards in Los Angeles, California. In 1987, he won the Grammy Award for Best Male Rock Vocal Performance for "Addicted to Love". At the 1987 Brit Awards, Palmer received his first nomination for Best British Male.

Another single from Riptide, his cover of R&B singer Cherrelle's "I Didn't Mean to Turn You On", also performed well (US No. 2, UK No. 9). The song, "Trick Bag," was written by one of Palmer's major influences, New Orleans blues artist Earl King.

For the album, Palmer collaborated with two former members of his band the Power Station: guitarist Andy Taylor and drummer Tony Thompson. The Power Station's producer Bernard Edwards also played bass and produced the album. The album also features contributions from Chaka Khan and notable session musicians such as Guy Pratt, Wally Badarou, Jeff Bova, Eddie Martinez, Dony Wynn, and Jack Waldman (who died a year after the album's release).

The title track of the album is a cover of a 1933 song written by Walter Donaldson and Gus Kahn and first recorded by Eddy Duchin and his orchestra.

2013 reissue
Riptide was reissued on 30 April 2013 by Culture Factory USA, an independent label that specialises in cult artists. The reissue CD was packaged in a miniature replica of the original quality vinyl packaging complete with an inner sleeve that features the original lyrics, photographs of Palmer and credits for the album. The label side of the CD features a replica of what the original Island label looked like at the time of issue and even features "grooves" as if the black CD is made of vinyl.

The reissues did not have any additional outtakes or bonus tracks.

Critical reception

In a contemporary review music critic Robert Christgau gave the album a "C+" and described it as "his pop breakthrough" and added that "what makes him barely listenable is his holdings in r&b."

In a retrospective review for AllMusic, critic Tim DiGravina gave the album four and a half out of five stars and wrote that "Riptide packages Robert Palmer's voice and suave personality into a commercial series of mostly rocking songs that seem custom-tailored to be chart hits."

Track listing

Additional tracks

In popular culture
 "Weird Al" Yankovic included a parody of Palmer's hit "Addicted To Love" on his 1986 album Polka Party! ("Addicted To Spuds").
 The track "Hyperactive" was used in the 1987 film The Bedroom Window, as well as in the popular American TV series Moonlighting.

Personnel 
Credits are adapted from the Riptide liner notes.
 Robert Palmer – lead and backing vocals
 Wally Badarou – keyboards
 Jeff Bova – keyboards
 Jack Waldman – keyboards
 Eddie Martinez – guitars
 Andy Taylor – guitar (3)
 Bernard Edwards – bass (1-7, 9)
 Guy Pratt – bass (8)
 Tony Thompson – drums (1-4, 6, 7, 9)
 Dony Wynn – drums (5, 8)
 Lenny Pickett – saxophone
 Benny Diggs – backing vocals (3, 8)
 Fonzi Thornton – backing vocals (3, 8)
 Chaka Khan – vocal arrangements (3)

Production 
 Producer – Bernard Edwards 
 Post-production – Eric "ET" Thorngren and Robert Palmer 
 Engineer – Jason Corsaro 
 Assistant engineers – Michael Abbott, Benjamin Armbrister, Steve Boyer, Jamie Chaleff, John Davenport, Billy Miranda, Dan Peterkofsky and Steve Rinkoff.
 Mixed by Eric "ET" Thorngren
 Recorded at Compass Point Studios (Nassasu, Bahamas).
 Mixed at The Power Station, Electric Lady Studios, The Hit Factory and Right Track Recording (New York, NY).
 Mastered by Jack Skinner at Sterling Sound (New York, NY).
 CD mastering by Barry Diament at Atlantic Studios (New York, NY).
 Illustration – Susan Palmer
 Design – Robert Palmer 
 Photography – Giuseppe Pino

Charts

Weekly charts

Year-end charts

Certifications

Release history

References

External links

Robert Palmer (singer) albums
1985 albums
Island Records albums
Albums produced by Bernard Edwards